Ostrý Grúň is a village and municipality in the Žarnovica District, Banská Bystrica Region in Slovakia.

History
The village was massacred and burned down in January 1945 by the Nazi anti-partisan unit Edelweiss, after the suppression of the Slovak National Uprising.

Geography
The municipality lies at an altitude of 450 metres, covering an area of 16.71 km². It is part of the Vtáčnik mountain range, within the Slovak Central Mountains.

Demographics
The municipality has a population of 543, as of December 2019.

In 2011, 86% of the population identified as Slovak. The religious makeup was 75.6% Roman Catholic and 4.2% unaffiliated.

International relations

Twin towns — Sister cities
Ostrý Grúň is twinned with:
 Kandanos, Greece (since 1987)

References

External links
http://www.statistics.sk/mosmis/eng/run.html

Villages and municipalities in Žarnovica District